John Blythe (31 October 1921 – 24 November 1993) was an English character actor.

Career
He entered films as a stage hand aged sixteen and made his film debut with Goodbye Mr. Chips in 1939 as one of the schoolboys (uncredited). 

His second film role was the much more substantial role of Reg Gibbons, son of Robert Newton's and Celia Johnson's Frank and Ethel, in Noël Coward's and David Lean's This Happy Breed (1944). He had a brief part, too, as Jane Hylton's boyfriend in Dear Murderer, in 1947. He went on to specialise in playing spivs and fast talking wide boys, particularly during the late 'forties and early 'fifties when he enjoyed memorable roles in films such as Holiday Camp (1947), A Boy, a Girl and a Bike, Diamond City, Boys in Brown (all 1949) and Lili Marlene (1950). He was also the garage owner Gowan in the three Huggett films, Here Come the Huggetts (1948), Vote for Huggett and The Huggetts Abroad (both 1949).

He featured also, in:-

Meet Mr. Malcolm (1954); The Cockleshell Heroes (1955); No Love for Johnnie (1961); The VIPs (1963), as well as many television series, including Hancock's Half Hour, No Hiding Place, Dixon of Dock Green, Crown Court, Poldark and in 1974 as a crooked second hand car dealer in the popular comedy series Sykes, the episode entitled Two Birthdays.

He continued acting into the 1980s and died in London on 24 November 1993.

References

External links
 

1921 births
1993 deaths
English male film actors
English male television actors
20th-century English male actors
People from London